WION (World is One News) is an Indian multinational English language news channel headquartered in New Delhi. It is owned by the Essel Group and is part of the Zee Media network of channels.

History 
Zee Media hired Rohit Gandhi as the founder and first editor-in-chief to build the channel in August 2015. Gandhi spent the first 6 months in building the vision, branding, and technology of the network. In May 2016, he hired his former student Mandy Clark, former CBS correspondent, as his deputy for running the network. He then hired the senior management team, which included Mithaq Kazimi as Managing Producer, and senior journalists Surya Gangadharan as head of TV output and Padma Rao head of input.

The founding team, led by Rohit Gandhi, spent over a year interviewing 2,300 people to select about 200 journalists, with two HR professionals, Varsha Sinha and Vancha Garg, to select his team. The founding hired correspondents in countries throughout the world. Bureaus were established in zones in conflict with India, such as Taha Siddiqui in Pakistan was one of his hires who later had to seek asylum after Gandhi exited from the network. He also hired journalists, including Saad Hammadi, Bangladesh bureau chief and former correspondent for The Guardian, Archith Seshadri, former CNN anchor, and Anchal Vohra as the Beirut and conflict region at large Correspondent.

Its website was launched in many countries as a free-to-air satellite service on 15 June 2016. The television channel began airing on 15 August 2016. WION is India's first privately owned international news channel.

Team

Past Team 
Sudhir Chaudhary served as its editor-in-chief after Gandhi until he left in 2021. Before switching to CNN-News18, Palki Sharma Upadhyay served for 4 years and resigned in September 2022. Past team includes Naveen Kapoor and Kartikeya Sharma.

Current team 
The current team includes Sidhant Sibal of DD News, who joined the media corporation on 1 April 2018. Sumit Chaturvedi, who was previously with ET Now and CNBC TV18, currently looks after the business news content and conducts morning and evening business shows called "WALLET". Madhu Soman, formerly with Reuters and Bloomberg, joined as Chief business officer in 2022. While Molly Gambhir and Neha Khanna replace Palki Sharma's position to become leading anchors of the channel. Other Associated journalists include Digvijay Singh Deo, Shivan Chanana, Rabin Sharma, Ieshan Wani, Priyanka Sharma and Alyson le Grange.

The channel's Pakistan bureau chief, Taha Siddiqui, was forced into exile after a failed kidnapping attempt in Islamabad. He was replaced by Anas Mallick.

Content 
WION is a traditional news channel that includes anchored programming as well as special programming listed below.

TV programs

News program 
 Top Stories: Brings the breaking news of the hour from India and abroad.
 WION Speed News: A news segment of WION which brings the top stories of the morning
 WION News Direct: A 30-minute news section delivered by WION New York and London studios
 WION Pulse: A global news section starting to stream since 7 November 2022
 WION Edge: One of WION's most viewed programs, focusing on stories and people from India and abroad. Created by Mithaq Kazimi

Prime time talk shows 
 Gravitas: WION's prime-time show which brings viewers news and discussions on concurrent issues from India and abroad. 
 Gravitas Plus: A digital exclusive (Youtube and other social handles including official website) show.
 Global Leadership Series (GLS): An interview-based program featuring a selection of heads of state or government.

Regional news talk shows 
 The India Story with Vikram Chandra
 World of Africa: A weekly program that concentrates on African politics, society, and cultures
 Inside South Asia with Neha Khanna: A weekly program that concentrates on South Asian politics, society, and cultures
 The West Asia Post

Other programs 
 WION Tech It Out: a weekly technology show
 WION Fineprint: An analysis of international news and developments regarding social and economic issues
 The Diplomacy Show: Interviews with diplomats.
 WION World Order: A platform for mutual dialogue on foreign policies.
 WION Sports: Covers global sports.
 WION Wallet: Coverage of finance and the economy
 Your Story: information on the most trending stories of the day from India and abroad.
 WION Pitstop: An auto-show covering previews, launches, first-drive/ride reports, comparisons and motorsport action from India and abroad.
 WION Wings: India's first aviation show on television, covering flying, air shows, pilots, airlines and general aviation
 WION MELT: interviews with marketing profession
 World at War: A special program delivered during the Russian invasion in Ukraine.

Previous shows 
 Democracy & Dictatorship, created and hosted by Rohit Gandhi (2016–2017)
 Konversations created and hosted by Mithaq Kazimi (2016-2017) 
 This Also Happened, created by Mithaq Kazimi and hosted by Archit Sheshadri and Sana Khan (2016-2018)
 Wion 360° VR created by Mithaq Kazimi, hosted by various anchors (2016-2017) 
"#MixTape" Created by Mithaq Kazimi, hosted by various hosts (2017)
 WION Breakfast, hosted by various anchors (2016–2017)
 Tale of two cities: A special program delivered by architect Dikshu Kukreja

Awards 
Best Anchor, 2021, by India Chapter of the International Advertising Association

Channel of the Year, 2020, by Exchange4media News Broadcasting Awards

Partnerships 
WION has partnered with a number of media organizations, including Voice of America and Carnegie India.

Controversies

Appointment of M. J. Akbar
In 2021, the appointment of M. J. Akbar, an Indian journalist and politician who has been accused of sexual assault by women, to WION as an "editorial consultant" was met with controversy, with more than 150 journalists signing a statement demanding that Akbar be removed by WION and Zee News.

2022 YouTube block
On 22 March 2022, WION was blocked from YouTube for "violating Youtube's community guidelines". YouTube had taken objection to a video posted on 10 March broadcasting a speech by Sergey Lavrov, head of Russia's Ministry of Foreign Affairs, denying the 2022 Russian invasion of Ukraine. YouTube unblocked the channel on 26 March after a social media campaign by WION.

Lawsuit against former anchor Palki Sharma
After former anchor Palki Sharma Upadhyay announced her retirement from WION and the creation of new talk show in CNN-News18, WION filed a lawsuit to Upadhyay, by saying that "confidential and proprietary Zee information" are taken by Upadhyay, and demanded that Upadhyay should continue to work for WION until December 2022 and pay for damages worth Rs. 2 crore. However, the Delhi High court refused WION's appeal, and the next hearing of the case would be delayed until March 2023.

References

External links

24-hour television news channels in India
Zee Entertainment Enterprises
Television stations in Delhi
Essel Group
Television channels and stations established in 2016
English-language television stations in the United Kingdom
24-hour television news channels in the United Kingdom
Television channels in the United Kingdom
Multilingual news services
English-language television stations in India
2016 establishments in Delhi